Scotinotylus amurensis is a species of sheet weaver found in Russia. It was described by Eskov & Marusik in 1994.

References

Linyphiidae
Spiders of Russia
Spiders described in 1994